Michael M. Steponovich (December 5, 1908 – May 1974) was an American football guard in the National Football League for the Boston Redskins.  He attended Saint Mary's College of California.  He was selected as a third-team guard on the 1932 College Football All-America Team.

References

1908 births
1974 deaths
People from Lead, South Dakota
American football guards
Boston Redskins players